The 1998–99 All-Ireland Senior Club Football Championship was the 29th staging of the All-Ireland Senior Club Football Championship since its establishment by the Gaelic Athletic Association in 1970-71. The championship began on 4 October 1998 and ended on 17 March 1999.

Corofin entered the championship as the defending champions, however, they were beaten by Ballina Stephenites in the Ulster Club Championship.

On 17 March 1999, Crossmaglen Rangers won the championship following a 0-09 to 0-08 defeat of Ballina Stephenites in the All-Ireland final at Croke Park. It was their second championship title overall and their first title since 1997.

Crossmaglen's Oisín McConville was the championship's top scorer with 1-31.

Results

Connacht Senior Club Football Championship

Quarter-finals

Semi-finals

Final

Leinster Senior Club Football Championship

First round

Quarter-finals

Semi-finals

Final

Munster Senior Club Football Championship

Quarter-finals

Semi-finals

Final

Ulster Senior Club Football Championship

Preliminary round

Quarter-finals

Semi-finals

Final

All-Ireland Senior Club Football Championship

Quarter-final

Semi-finals

Final

Championship statistics

Top scorers

Overall

In a single game

Miscellaneous

 Doonbeg became the first team from Clare to win the Munster Club Championship.
 Ballina Stephenites won the Connacht Club Championship title for the first time in their history.

References

1998 in Gaelic football
1999 in Gaelic football